The 1946 Prairie View A&M Panthers football team was an American football team that represented Prairie View A&M University in the Southwestern Athletic Conference (SWAC) during the 1946 college football season. In their second season under head coach Billy Nicks, the team compiled a 6–2–2 record (2–2–2 against SWAC opponents), defeated Lincoln (MO) in the Prairie View Bowl, and outscored opponents by a total of 153 to 85. 

The Dickinson System rated Prairie View as the No. 9 black college football team for 1946.

Schedule

References

Prairie View
Prairie View A&M Panthers football seasons
Prairie View football